Detlev Thorith (27 September 1942 – 18 July 2019) was an East German discus thrower. He was born in Köslin. He started for the Sportvereinigung (SV) Dynamo. He competed in the men's discus throw at the 1972 Summer Olympics.

References 

1942 births
2019 deaths
East German male discus throwers
People from Koszalin
Sportspeople from West Pomeranian Voivodeship
European Athletics Championships medalists
Athletes (track and field) at the 1972 Summer Olympics
Olympic athletes of East Germany